An unqualified reference to Lord Norwich could refer to:

 Earl of Norwich, an extinct title created three times in the Peerage of England and once in the Peerage of Great Britain
 Viscount Norwich, a title created in the Peerage of the United Kingdom in 1952